Marilynne Summers Robinson (born November 26, 1943) is an American novelist and essayist. Across her writing career, Robinson has received numerous awards, including the Pulitzer Prize for Fiction in 2005, National Humanities Medal in 2012, and the 2016 Library of Congress Prize for American Fiction. In 2016, Robinson was named in Time magazine's list of 100 most influential people. Robinson began teaching at the Iowa Writers' Workshop in 1991 and retired in the spring of 2016.

Robinson is best known for her novels Housekeeping (1980) and Gilead (2004). Her novels are noted for their thematic depiction of faith and rural life. The subjects of her essays span numerous topics, including the relationship between religion and science, US history, nuclear pollution, John Calvin, and contemporary American politics.

Family and education
Robinson was born as Marilynne Summers on November 26, 1943 in Sandpoint, Idaho, the daughter of Eileen (Harris) and John J. Summers, a lumber company employee. Her brother is the art historian David Summers, who dedicated his book Vision, Reflection, and Desire in Western Painting to her. She did her undergraduate work at Pembroke College, the former women's college at Brown University, receiving her Bachelor of Arts degree magna cum laude in 1966, where she was elected to Phi Beta Kappa. At Brown, one of her teachers was the celebrated postmodern novelist John Hawkes. She received her Doctor of Philosophy degree in English from the University of Washington in 1977.

Writing career
Robinson has written five highly acclaimed novels: Housekeeping (1980), Gilead (2004), Home (2008), Lila (2014), and Jack (2020). Housekeeping was a finalist for the 1982 Pulitzer Prize for Fiction (US), Gilead was awarded the 2005 Pulitzer, and Home received the 2009 Orange Prize for Fiction (UK). Home and Lila are companions to Gilead and focus on the Boughton and Ames families during the same time period.

Robinson is also the author of many non-fiction works, including Mother Country: Britain, the Welfare State, and Nuclear Pollution (1989), The Death of Adam: Essays on Modern Thought (1998), Absence of Mind: The Dispelling of Inwardness from the Modern Myth of the Self (2010), When I Was a Child I Read Books: Essays (2012), The Givenness of Things: Essays (2015), and What Are We Doing Here? (2018). She has written numerous articles, essays and reviews for Harper's, The Paris Review, and The New York Review of Books. On January 24, 2013, Robinson was announced to be among the finalists for the 2013 Man Booker International Prize. She won the 2013 Park Kyong-ni Prize.

Academic affiliations
In addition to her tenure from 1991 to 2016 on the faculty of the University of Iowa, where she retired as the F. Wendell Miller Professor of English and Creative Writing, Robinson has been writer-in-residence or visiting professor at many colleges and universities, including Amherst, and the University of Massachusetts Amherst's MFA Program for Poets and Writers. In 2009, she held a Dwight H. Terry Lectureship at Yale University, where she delivered a series of talks titled Absence of Mind: The Dispelling of Inwardness from the Modern Myth of the Self. On April 19, 2010, she was elected a fellow of the American Academy of Arts and Sciences. In May 2011, Robinson delivered the University of Oxford's annual Esmond Harmsworth Lecture in American Arts and Letters at the university's Rothermere American Institute.

Robinson was the keynote speaker for the 75th anniversary celebration of the Iowa Writers' Workshop in June 2011, and she gave the 2012 Annual Buechner Lecture at The Buechner Institute at King University. On February 18, 2013, she was the speaker at the Easter Convocation of the University of the South, Sewanee, Tennessee and was awarded the degree of Doctor of Literature honoris causa. In 2012, Brown University awarded Robinson the degree of Doctor of Literature honoris causa. The College of the Holy Cross, Notre Dame, Amherst College, Skidmore College, the University of Oxford, and Yale University have also awarded Robinson honorary degrees. She has been elected a fellow of Mansfield College, Oxford.

Commendations
The former Archbishop of Canterbury, Rowan Williams, has described Robinson as "one of the world's most compelling English-speaking novelists", adding that "Robinson's is a voice we urgently need to attend to in both Church and society here [in the UK]."

On June 26, 2015, President Barack Obama quoted Robinson in his eulogy for Clementa C. Pinckney of Emanuel African Methodist Episcopal Church in Charleston, South Carolina. In speaking about "an open heart," Obama said:  a friend of mine, the writer Marilynne Robinson, calls 'that reservoir of goodness, beyond, and of another kind, that we are able to do each other in the ordinary cause of things.'"  In November 2015, The New York Review of Books published a two-part conversation between Obama and Robinson, covering topics in American history and the role of faith in society.

Personal life
Robinson was raised as a Presbyterian and later became a Congregationalist, worshipping and sometimes preaching at the Congregational United Church of Christ in Iowa City. Her Congregationalism and her interest in the ideas of John Calvin have been important in many of her novels, including Gilead, which centers on the life and theological concerns of a fictional Congregationalist minister. In an interview with the Church Times in 2012, Robinson said: "I think, if people actually read Calvin, rather than read Max Weber, he would be rebranded. He is a very respectable thinker."

In 1967 she married Fred Miller Robinson, a writer and professor at the University of Massachusetts Amherst. The Robinsons divorced in 1989.

The couple had two sons. In the late 1970s, she wrote Housekeeping in the evenings while they slept. Robinson said they influenced her writing in many ways, since  changes your sense of life, your sense of yourself."

Robinson still lives in Iowa City, and spends the summers with family in upstate New York.

Bibliography

Fiction
 Housekeeping (1980) , 
 Gilead (2004) , 
 Home (2008) , 
 Lila (2014) , 
 Jack (2020) ,

Online fiction
 Jack and Della - published in The New Yorker on July 13, 2020
  Kansas - published in The New Yorker on September 6, 2004

Nonfiction

Books
 Mother Country: Britain, the Welfare State, and Nuclear Pollution (1989) , 
 The Death of Adam: Essays on Modern Thought (1998) , 
 Absence of Mind: The Dispelling of Inwardness from the Modern Myth of the Self (2010) , 
 When I Was a Child I Read Books (2012)
 The Givenness of Things: Essays (2015) , 
 What Are We Doing Here?: Essays (2018) ,

Essays and reporting
 
 "On Edgar Allan Poe", The New York Review of Books, vol. LXII, no. 2 (February 5, 2015), pp. 4, 6.

Interviews
 A September 2015 interview with Barack Obama in Des Moines, Iowa, recorded by the New York Review of Books and published in the October issues of the magazine in two parts

Awards
 1982: Hemingway Foundation/PEN Award for best first novel for Housekeeping
 1982: Pulitzer Prize for Fiction shortlist for Housekeeping 
 1989: National Book Award for Nonfiction shortlist for Mother Country: Britain, the Welfare State, and Nuclear Pollution
 1999: PEN/Diamonstein-Spielvogel Award for the Art of the Essay for The Death of Adam
 2004: National Book Critics Circle Award for Fiction for Gilead
 2005: Pulitzer Prize for Fiction for Gilead
 2005: Ambassador Book Award for Gilead
 2006: University of Louisville Grawemeyer Award in Religion 
 2008: National Book Award finalist for Home
 2008: Los Angeles Times Book Prize for fiction for Home
 2009: Orange Prize for Fiction for Home
 2011: Man Booker International Prize nominee
 2012: Honorary Doctorate of Letters from Brown University
 2012: National Humanities Medal for "grace and intelligence in writing"
 2013: Man Booker International Prize nominee
 2013: Park Kyong-ni Prize
 2014: National Book Critics Circle Award for Lila
 2014: National Book Award finalist for Lila
 2015: Man Booker Prize longlist for Lila
 2016: Library of Congress Prize for American Fiction and Dayton Literary Peace Prize

References

External links

 
 
 Recognitions by: Marilynne Robinson on her opinion of Marcel Proust, PEN American Center
 Marilynne Robinson Papers. Yale Collection of American Literature, Beinecke Rare Book and Manuscript Library.

1943 births
Living people
20th-century American novelists
21st-century American novelists
Academics of the University of Kent
American Congregationalists
American women novelists
Pembroke College in Brown University alumni
Brown University alumni
Christian novelists
Iowa Writers' Workshop faculty
Writers from Iowa City, Iowa
Pulitzer Prize for Fiction winners
University of Iowa faculty
University of Massachusetts Amherst faculty
University of Washington alumni
Novelists from Idaho
People from Sandpoint, Idaho
National Humanities Medal recipients
American women essayists
20th-century American women writers
21st-century American women writers
Hemingway Foundation/PEN Award winners
PEN/Diamonstein-Spielvogel Award winners
20th-century American essayists
21st-century American essayists
PEN/Faulkner Award for Fiction winners
Novelists from Massachusetts
Novelists from Iowa
American women academics
Members of the American Academy of Arts and Letters